Ambassis fontoynonti, commonly known as the dusky glass perch, is a species of fish in the family Ambassidae. It is endemic to rivers in eastern Madagascar.  Its natural habitat is rivers. It is threatened by habitat loss. The specific name honours the pathologist Maurice Fontoynont (1869-1948) who was president of the Malagasy Academy.

References

fontoynonti
Freshwater fish of Madagascar
Fish described in 1832
Taxa named by Jacques Pellegrin
Taxonomy articles created by Polbot